Khalid Abdalla (born 26 October 1980) is a Scottish actor and activist of Egyptian descent. He came to international prominence after starring in the 2006 Academy Award-nominated and BAFTA-winning film United 93. Written and directed by Paul Greengrass, it chronicles events aboard United Airlines Flight 93, which was hijacked as part of the 11 September attacks. Abdalla played Ziad Jarrah, the pilot and leader of the four hijackers on board the flight. He starred as Amir in The Kite Runner and acted with Matt Damon in Green Zone, his second film with director Paul Greengrass. Abdalla appears as himself in Jehane Noujaim's documentary on the 2011 Egyptian revolution, The Square, which won the Audience Award at Sundance Festival in 2013.

Abdalla is on the board of the National Student Drama Festival. In 2011, Abdalla became one of the founding members of the Mosireen ("We Insist") Collective in Cairo: a group of revolutionary filmmakers and activists dedicated to supporting citizen media across Egypt in the wake of Mubarak's fall. Three months after it began, Mosireen became the most watched non-profit YouTube channel in Egypt of all time, and in the whole world in January 2012.

Early life
Abdalla was born in Glasgow, Scotland, to Egyptian parents, and was brought up in London. Abdalla's father and grandfather were well-known anti-regime activists in Egypt. His parents were both physicians who immigrated to the UK before he was born.

Abdalla was educated at King's College School, an independent school for boys in Wimbledon in South West London and his classmates included actor Ben Barnes and comedian Tom Basden. He became interested in acting after becoming involved in his school's thriving drama scene. In 1998, he directed a production of Someone Who'll Watch Over Me by Frank McGuinness, which ended up having a successful run at the Edinburgh Festival and earned five stars in The Scotsman newspaper, making him the youngest director to receive this accolade.

After spending a gap year travelling around the Middle East, Abdalla went on to Queens' College, Cambridge, where he read English. He was active in the student drama scene alongside the likes of contemporaries Rebecca Hall and Dan Stevens. He was a joint winner with Cressida Trew, his future wife, of the Judges' Award for Acting at the National Student Drama Festival for his performance in Bedbound by Enda Walsh.

Career
In 2003, Abdalla played the title role in Christopher Marlowe's Tamburlaine the Great at the Rose Theatre. This was the inaugural production of Peter Hall's Canon's Mouth Theatre Company composed of "young actors intent on discovering a new voice for the great metaphorical dramas of the Renaissance".

Abdalla's first screen role was in a 2005 episode of Spooks entitled Infiltration of a New Threat.

In 2006, Abdalla made his Hollywood debut in United 93, a film about the 11 September attacks, and garnered critical acclaim for his portrayal of Ziad Jarrah. He was cast in the lead role of the film The Kite Runner. In preparation for that role, he spent time in Kabul learning Dari Persian and kite-flying.

In 2008, Abdalla appeared as Guy Pringle in the BBC Radio 4 adaptation of Fortunes of War. He starred as Freddy in Green Zone with Matt Damon and director Paul Greengrass.

In 2009–10, Abdalla produced and acted in the independent Egyptian film In the Last Days of the City, directed by Tamer El Said.

In November 2010, Abdalla was awarded special recognition for achievements in cinema at the Cairo International Film Festival.

In 2011, he was narrator in documentary film East to West, also known as The River Flows Westward.

In 2016, he appeared as Muhammad XII of Granada in the film Assassin's Creed.

In September 2021, it was announced that Abdalla would portray Princess Diana’s partner, Dodi Fayed, in the fifth season of The Crown. It was released in November 2022.

Personal life
In January–February 2011, Abdalla was among protesters in Tahrir Square in Cairo, Egypt in the major protests against the Hosni Mubarak regime. He also appeared on Wolf Blitzer on CNN on 9 February 2011 and Anderson Cooper to reflect his views on the protest. He continues to be active in Egypt.

In 2011 Abdalla became one of the founding members of the Mosireen Collective in Cairo: a group of revolutionary filmmakers and activists dedicated to supporting citizen media across Egypt in the wake of Mubarak's fall. Mosireen films the ongoing revolution, publishes videos that challenge state media narratives, provides trainings and equipment and screenings and holds an extensive library of footage. At three months old, Mosireen became the most watched non-profit YouTube channel in Egypt of all time, and in the whole world in January 2012.

In September 2011, Abdalla married his long-time girlfriend, Cressida Trew.

Filmography

References

External links

1980 births
Living people
Alumni of Queens' College, Cambridge
British Muslims
Egyptian activists
Egyptian male film actors
English people of Egyptian descent
Male actors from Glasgow
Male actors from London
People educated at King's College School, London
Scottish male film actors
Scottish male radio actors
Scottish male stage actors
Scottish male television actors
Scottish male voice actors
Scottish people of Egyptian descent